Mosharrahat Rural District is a rural district (dehestan) in the Central District of Ahvaz County, Khuzestan Province, Iran. At the 2006 census, its population was 7,651, in 1,452 families.  The rural district has 29 villages.

Transportation  
The closest to Mosharrahat Rural District is Ahwaz International Airport, which is about 22 km away.

References 

Rural Districts of Khuzestan Province
Ahvaz County